Sidney Lanier High School is a local public high school of the San Antonio Independent School District in the westside of San Antonio, Texas (United States). Serving the San Antonio Independent School District, Lanier boasts an enrollment of more than 1700 students.

History
Sidney Lanier High School first opened in 1915 as McKinley Elementary School. The school is named after Confederate poet Sidney Lanier, who came to San Antonio in 1872 in search of a cure for tuberculosis.  He didn't find one but became enchanted with the  Mexican flavor of San Antonio. In San Antonio, Lanier sought out the local historians and penned his long, essay entitled, "San Antonio de Bexar," in 1873. In 1923, McKinley was renamed after Sidney Lanier in accordance with the District's practice of naming the junior schools after American authors. Lanier became a junior-senior high school in 1929 until 1969 when Tafolla Middle School opened. The new Lanier Campus, on the site of the old school, opened in 1975. Currently, Sidney Lanier High School serves 9th through 12th grade students.

The most tumultuous event occurred between the years 1967 and 1969 when a group of students changed the curricular structure of the school amid cries of vocational tracking and insufficient academic college preparation. Student leaders Homer Garcia, Edgar Lozano, Stephen Castro, Irene Ramirez, and other participants challenged the authority of the school and staged a walkout that catapulted Sidney Lanier into the limelight and forced district to adapt changes. Student Council President Pablo Ortiz was appointed by school administrators after Homer Garcia was deemed too disruptive and radical. Later, school administrators finally bowed to student and community pressure conceding to demands. Even though a massive walkout was averted, some students did stage their own protest march leaving the campus during lunch. In the end, the legacy benefited students to the point that more scholarships were awarded and change became apparent. The 1969 graduate, Homer Garcia, ultimately became an unsung hero and forged alliances with other campus leaders. He went on to graduate from the University of Texas culminating in a Ph.D. in sociology from Yale University.

Other students involved indirectly were members of the Mexican American Youth Organization (MAYO) started by Mario Compean, Jose Angel Gutierrez, and Ignacio Garcia, all students at St. Mary's University.  Student leaders from Edgewood High School and even former Central Catholic High School students contributed with ideas and participatory support. Former alumni from the pivotal year went on to author books and become professors (Rafael Castillo, Ignacio Garcia and Daniel Hernandez).

Traditions
Their mascot is a Vok, a gear emblem which symbolizes a smaller part of a big machine. Ultimately, the Vok represents an essential gear that would not function without support from its integral whole therefore analogous to a vocational student entering society and the workforce. Sidney Lanier was one of the first vocational schools in the westside of San Antonio. The school's most popular event, "The Chili Bowl," an annual football game played yearly against its rival Fox Tech High School since 1932, was popular until Fox Tech closed. Although the term "Chili Bowl" has an underlying negative connotation with racist tint, the alumni adopted it nonetheless and reversed its negative effects by owning it.  The district, however, announced in November 2009 that it would discontinue sports at Fox Tech as part of its plan to convert Fox Tech into a magnet school (football to be discontinued after the 2009-2010 year, and the remaining sports after two more years), thus ending the event after 2009. The Lanier Voks ended up winning the last game over the Buffaloes, 30–14. Afterwards both of the teams gathered in the center of Alamo Stadium, the place where this historic event was held, and took time to reflect on what this tradition meant to them, and how it felt to take part in this game. They joined in a chant, "Brothers!" and left after few photo-ops

Athletics
The Lanier Voks compete in the following sports:

Baseball
Basketball
Cross Country
Football
Golf
Soccer
Softball
Swimming and Diving
Tennis
Track and Field
Volleyball

References

Castillo, Rafael. Books opened minds and inspired change. San Antonio Express-News. December 4, 2017.
Recalling the walkouts of 1968. http://www.expressnews.com/150years/education-health/article/in1968-students-here-defied-prejudice-and6446428.php?
United States Commission on Civil Rights. Hearing Before the United States Commission On Civil Rights.: Hearing Held In San Antonio, Texas, December 9–14, 1968. Washington:U.S. Govt. Print. Off, 1969. 
Garcia, Ignacio. United We Stand: The rise and fall of La Raza Unida Party. Tucson: University of Arizona Press, 1989.
Hernandez, Daniel. The Milagro Affair. Archway Publications, 2017.
Castillo, Rafael. Aurora. Berkeley Press, 2010.
Castillo, Rafael. Distant Journeys. Bilingual Review: Arizona State University, 1990.
Lanier, Sidney. ""San Antonio de Bear"". (reprinted by Mary Ann Guerra). American Litho, 1980.

External links
 

Educational institutions established in 1915
High schools in San Antonio
San Antonio Independent School District high schools
1915 establishments in Texas